#Family is a Ugandan sitcom created by the Nabwisos and produced at their Nabwiso Films production company. The series stars Eleanor and Matthew Nabwiso as Jackie and Frank Mpanga, the matriarch and patriarch of a middle-class Ugandan family and their daughter Molly (Ruth Kamanzi) and son Timothy (Sasha Serugo). The series also stars Cleopatra Koheirwe as Leah and radio presenter and TV news anchor Andrew Kyamagero as Uncle Robert. It premiered on NTV Uganda on December 16, 2018.

Plot
Frank and Jackie Mpanga are a happily married couple with two children but their marriage is tested when Jackie's old college friend pays her a visit. Jackie then gets a job but Frank's traditional conservative beliefs start to crash on Jackie's new dream.

Cast

Awards and nominations

References

External links
 #Family Series Trailer
 

Ugandan comedy television series
2019 Ugandan television series debuts
2010s Ugandan television series
Television series about families
NTV Uganda original programming
Pearl Magic original programming